Løpsmarka is a village in Bodø Municipality in Nordland county, Norway.

References

Bodø
Villages in Nordland
Populated places of Arctic Norway